Göybulaq (also, Geybulag and Gëybulak) is a village and municipality in the Shaki Rayon of Azerbaijan.  It has a population of 370.

References 

Populated places in Shaki District